Albert Todd may refer to:

Albert Todd (Missouri politician) (1813–1885), American politician and lawyer
Albert M. Todd (1850–1931), businessman and politician from the U.S. state of Michigan
Albert E. Todd (1878–1928), Canadian politician
Albert Wheeler Todd (1856–1924), American architect